Scott Uplands is a group of rounded hills rising to about 1,500 m south of Seward Mountains in southwest Palmer Land. Mapped by United States Geological Survey (USGS) from aerial photographs taken by the U.S. Navy, 1966–69. Surveyed by British Antarctic Survey (BAS), 1974–75. Named by the United Kingdom Antarctic Place-Names Committee (UK-APC) in 1977 after Roger J. Scott, BAS surveyor, Stonington Island, 1973–75, who was in charge of the survey party in this area.

Hills of Palmer Land